The arrondissement of Saint-Julien-en-Genevois is an arrondissement of France in the Haute-Savoie department in the Auvergne-Rhône-Alpes region. It has 72 communes.

Composition

The communes of the arrondissement of Saint-Julien-en-Genevois, and their INSEE codes, are:
 
 Allonzier-la-Caille (74006)
 Ambilly (74008)
 Andilly (74009)
 Annemasse (74012)
 Arbusigny (74015)
 Archamps (74016)
 Arthaz-Pont-Notre-Dame (74021)
 Bassy (74029)
 Beaumont (74031)
 Bonne (74040)
 Bossey (74044)
 Cercier (74051)
 Cernex (74052)
 Challonges (74055)
 Chaumont (74065)
 Chavannaz (74066)
 Chêne-en-Semine (74068)
 Chênex (74069)
 Chessenaz (74071)
 Chevrier (74074)
 Chilly (74075)
 Clarafond-Arcine (74077)
 Clermont (74078)
 Collonges-sous-Salève (74082)
 Contamine-Sarzin (74086)
 Copponex (74088)
 Cranves-Sales (74094)
 Cruseilles (74096)
 Desingy (74100)
 Dingy-en-Vuache (74101)
 Droisy (74107)
 Éloise (74109)
 Étrembières (74118)
 Feigères (74124)
 Fillinges (74128)
 Franclens (74130)
 Frangy (74131)
 Gaillard (74133)
 Jonzier-Épagny (74144)
 Juvigny (74145)
 Lucinges (74153)
 Machilly (74158)
 Marlioz (74168)
 Menthonnex-en-Bornes (74177)
 Menthonnex-sous-Clermont (74178)
 Minzier (74184)
 Monnetier-Mornex (74185)
 La Muraz (74193)
 Musièges (74195)
 Nangy (74197)
 Neydens (74201)
 Pers-Jussy (74211)
 Présilly (74216)
 Reignier-Esery (74220)
 Saint-Blaise (74228)
 Saint-Cergues (74229)
 Saint-Germain-sur-Rhône (74235)
 Saint-Julien-en-Genevois (74243)
 Le Sappey (74259)
 Savigny (74260)
 Scientrier (74262)
 Seyssel (74269)
 Usinens (74285)
 Valleiry (74288)
 Vanzy (74291)
 Vers (74296)
 Vétraz-Monthoux (74298)
 Ville-la-Grand (74305)
 Villy-le-Bouveret (74306)
 Viry (74309)
 Vovray-en-Bornes (74313)
 Vulbens (74314)

History

The arrondissement of Saint-Julien-en-Genevois was created in 1860, disbanded in 1926 and restored in 1933.

As a result of the reorganisation of the cantons of France which came into effect in 2015, the borders of the cantons are no longer related to the borders of the arrondissements. The cantons of the arrondissement of Saint-Julien-en-Genevois were, as of January 2015:

 Annemasse-Nord
 Annemasse-Sud
 Cruseilles
 Frangy
 Reignier-Esery
 Saint-Julien-en-Genevois
 Seyssel

References

Saint-Julien-en-Genevois